Agnes Macdonald may refer to:
 Agnes Macdonald, 1st Baroness Macdonald of Earnscliffe, second wife of Sir John A. Macdonald
 Agnes Syme Macdonald, Scottish suffragette
 Agnes Gertrude VanKoughnet, Canadian socialite and second wife of Hugh John Macdonald
 Agnes MacDonald, one of the MacDonald sisters, Scottish women notable for their marriages to well-known men

See also
 Agnes McDonald, New Zealand nurse, postmistress and teacher